Wilhelmus Johannes Bekkers (21 August 1890 – 13 November 1957) was a Dutch tug of war competitor, who competed in the 1920 Summer Olympics. He was born in Arnhem and died in Arnhem. Bekkers was a swimming teacher in his birthplace, where he married Engelina Gouw in 1916. In 1920 he won the silver medal as member of the Dutch tug of war team.

References

External links
profile

1890 births
1957 deaths
Olympic tug of war competitors of the Netherlands
Tug of war competitors at the 1920 Summer Olympics
Olympic silver medalists for the Netherlands
Sportspeople from Arnhem
Olympic medalists in tug of war
Medalists at the 1920 Summer Olympics